Maryna Anatoliivna Poroshenko (née Perevedentseva; born 1 February 1962) is a Ukrainian cardiologist who was the First Lady of Ukraine from 2014 to 2019. She is married to former Ukrainian President Petro Poroshenko. After her husband's presidency ended in 2019, Maryna was a local political candidate for elections in Kyiv.

Biography
Maryna Poroshenko was born as Maryna Perevedentseva in 1962 in Kyiv, Ukrainian SSR, Soviet Union. Her father Anatoly (born 1933) was Deputy Minister of Health of the Ukrainian SSR. Her mother Lyudmyla worked at Kyiv Arsenal.

While studying at the Bogomolets National Medical University, she met Petro Poroshenko at a disco. They married in 1984. She worked as a cardiologist at the Zhovtneva Hospital until the birth of their first son, and after that, she devoted her time to her family. She does not take part in public life and does not discuss politics with her husband. She participates in the activities of the Petro Poroshenko Charity Foundation.

In 2007 she graduated from National Academy of Government Managerial Staff of Culture and Arts with degree in fine arts.

In a June 2014 televised interview, Maryna said that she plans to engage in social and cultural issues currently facing Ukraine. Late June 2014 she met with Iryna Herashchenko, an envoy to the Peace plan for Eastern Ukraine and a mediator in the  2014 pro-Russian conflict in Ukraine. They discussed possible assistance to the people in Eastern Ukraine.

From 2018 until 2019 she served as the Chairman of Ukrainian Cultural Foundation.

In the 2020 Kyiv local election Poroshenko is placed first on the Kyiv City Council election list of the party European Solidarity (the party (nationwide) lead by her husband Petro Poroshenko). In the election of Mayor of Kyiv (during the 2020 Kyiv local election) European Solidarity endorsed incumbent mayor Vitaly Klichko (who was nominated by the UDAR party). European Solidarity won 31 Kyiv City Council seats in the 2020 Kyiv local election. Klitschko was reelected as Mayor of Kyiv.

Family
Maryna and Petro Poroshenko have four children: son Olexiy (born 1985), twin daughters Yevheniia and Oleksandra (born 2000) and son Mykhailo (born 2001). The family continues to live in their private home in the historic neighborhood of Koncha-Zaspa. Oleksii was a representative in the regional parliament of Vinnytsia Oblast. In November 2014, he became People's Deputy of Ukraine.

Former Ukrainian president Viktor Yushchenko is the godfather to their children.

References

External links

 June 2014 interview with Maryna Poroshenko on 5 Kanal

1962 births
Living people
First Ladies of Ukraine
Politicians from Kyiv
Bogomolets National Medical University alumni
Women cardiologists
Ukrainian cardiologists
Eastern Orthodox Christians from Ukraine
Petro Poroshenko